The MV Sun Viking, was one of the three original cruise ships ordered by Royal Caribbean Cruise Lines as part of their early fleet. The ship was first put into service in 1972. She was scrapped at Gadani Ship Breaking Yard, Pakistan in February 2022. 

Along with her sister ships, Song of Norway and Nordic Prince, the class comprised the first purpose-built ships intended for Caribbean-based cruise travel. Sun Viking cruised the Mexican Riviera on a 7-day itinerary out of Los Angeles and the Caribbean out of San Juan, Puerto Rico in the early 1990s. The ship was retired in the late 1990s by Royal Caribbean, but continued in service with other cruise lines.

In 1998 Sun Viking was sold to Star Cruises and renamed SuperStar Sagittarius. She was later renamed Hyundai Pongnae in 2003, sailing for Hyundai Merchant Marine, before becoming Omar III with Asia Cruises.

The ship was renamed Long Jie in 2007. She was put up for sale on 10 June 2010. After being dry docked in Singapore, Long Jie was transformed into  Oriental Dragon, leaving Singapore on 24 March 2011 bound for Guangzhou, China.

After several years of service as a gambling ship in Hong Kong, she moved to Penang, Malaysia to continue her career in late 2019. In 2021, the ship was finally retired and was scrapped at Gadani Ship Breaking Yard, Pakistan in February 2022 as Dragon.

Media
In 1985, Sun Viking appeared in the opening sequences of episode 6 of The Day the Universe Changed and

In 2018, Oriental Dragon featured in the movie L Storm.

External links
 photographs from shipspotting.com

References

Ships built in Helsinki
1971 ships
Ships of Royal Caribbean International